"Who Needs the Moon" is a song recorded by Canadian country music artist Chad Klinger. It was released in 1999 as the first single from his debut album, Chad Klinger. It peaked at number 12 on the RPM Country Tracks chart in August 1999.

Chart performance

Year-end charts

References

1999 singles
Chad Klinger songs
1999 debut singles